Marich Man Singh Shrestha (1 January 1942 – 15 August 2013) was a Nepali politician and former Prime Minister of Nepal. He was born in 1942 in Khalanga Bazar, Salyan, Nepal. He served as the Prime Minister of Nepal from 15 June 1986 to 6 April 1990, and is remembered as the last Prime Minister of the Panchayat period and the Prime Minister during the 1989 Indian economic blockade on Nepal. Prior to that, he was the speaker of the Rastriya Panchayat from 1981 to 1985. He is one of the only two non-Khas Prime Ministers of Nepal, both the exceptions having been Newar Shresthas. He is the first Newar to have assumed the full title of the Prime Minister of Nepal, second if we count Gehendra Bahadur Rajbhandari who was  acknowledged as an Acting Prime Minister.

Political career
In his office, he braved the sixteen months long ordeal of economic blockade (March 23, 1989) imposed on Nepal by India. When this blockade caused immense fuel scarcity in the country, he is credited for not bowing to foreign power by bringing in fuel to support the entire country via aeroplanes and delivering it to individual households. He was responsible for the mass suppression of democratic forces during the Mass Movement of 2046 BS (1989 AD) and this act highly degraded his status. He was dismissed by the King Birendra during political tensions in which protestors called for multiparty elections. Subsequently, a draft constitution was introduced which allowed for direct elections to a bicameral parliament.

Death 
Shrestha was brought to the Kathmandu from New Delhi-based Medicity Hospital, where he had been undergoing treatment and was on ventilator support. He told family members that he wished to die in his own country and was air lifted to Kathmandu. Shrestha died of lung cancer at 3:00 on 15 August 2013 at  Norvic Hospital, Kathmandu.

References

External links
 Prime ministers of Nepal
 Office of the Prime Minister of Nepal, Official website

|-

Prime ministers of Nepal
1942 births
2013 deaths
Newar
People from Salyan District, Nepal
Speakers of the National Assembly (Nepal)
Nepalese Hindus
Deaths from lung cancer
Members of the Rastriya Panchayat
20th-century prime ministers of Nepal